John Alexander Holm (May 16, 1943 – December 28, 2015) was an American academic. He was Chair of English Linguistics and History of Civilizations at the University of Coimbra, Portugal.

Holm was born in Jackson, Michigan, and graduated from Jackson High School in 1961. He received a Ph.D. in linguistics from the University of London in 1978  with his thesis "The creole English of Nicaragua's Miskito Coast : its sociolinguistic history and a comparative study of its lexicon and syntax." He is a specialist on the history and languages of the Caribbean peoples, and the author of many books and articles  on those subjects. He is editor with   Susanne Maria Michaelis  of the series Contact languages : critical concepts in language studies. 

Thanks to the study of creoles, he showed that because of its importance in Barbados, the white population is the starting point of most of the English creoles that are spoken by the Indian, white and black peoples in most parts of the Caribbean and Carolina.

He also wrote the only one dictionary of Bahamian English. He died on December 28, 2015, in Azeitão, Portugal from prostate cancer.

Books
 Dictionary of Bahamian English, (with Alison Watt Shilling).   Cold Spring, N.Y.: Lexik House Publishers, 1982.    
 Central American English, (ed.) Heidelberg : J. Groos, 1983.
Review, by Steve Jones, Language in Society, Jun., 1984, vol. 13, no. 2, p. 281
Review, by J. L. Dillard,  Language, Jun., 1985, vol. 61, no. 2, p. 487-489
Review, by G. G. Gilbert, American Speech Autumn, 1985, vol. 60, no. 3, p. 261-269
 Pidgins and Creoles 2 vol.: v.1, " Theory and structure"; v.2, "References survey" Cambridge University Press, 1988-89  
Review,  Morris Goodman, in Journal of Pidgin and Creole Language, vol. 7, no. 2 (1992); p. 352-361.)
Review, by Salikoko S Mufwene, Language, Jun., 1991, vol. 67, no. 2, p. 380-387
Review by John McWhorter, Language in Society, Sep., 1991, vol. 20, no. 3, p. 477-483
Review, G. Sankoff,  American Anthropologist, Jun., 1991, vol. 93, no. 2, p. 511-512
Review, by P. Muysken, Journal of Linguistics, Sep., 1990, vol. 26, no. 2, p. 509-512
 An introduction to pidgins and creoles Cambridge University Press, 2000.  in 596 libraries according to  WorldCat
Review, by A. S. Kaye, Language, Jun., 2002, vol. 78, no. 2, p. 362-363
Review, by Patrick O. Steinkrüger, Zeitschrift für Sprachwissenschaft, 2004, vol. 23, no. 2, p. 300-301.
 Languages in contact: the partial restructuring of vernaculars   Cambridge University Press, 2004. in 282 libraries according to  WorldCat
Review by Patrick O. Steinkrüger, Zeitschrift für Sprachwissenschaft, 2006, vol. 25, no. 1, p. 154-156. 
Review by Raymond Hickey,  Anthropological linguistics. 48, no. 3, (2006): 299
Review by Anthony P Grant,   Language in Society, Apr., 2006, vol. 35, no. 2, p. 297-300
Review, by D. E. Wallcek, Language, Sep., 2006, vol. 82, no. 3, p. 683
  Comparative Creole Syntax: Parallel Outlines of 18 Creole Grammars. (with  Peter L. Patrick).  [London]: Battlebridge, 2007.

Articles

References

1943 births
2015 deaths
Linguists from the United States
People from Jackson, Michigan